Cerithium vulgatum is a species of sea snail, a marine gastropod mollusk in the family Cerithiidae.

Description

Distribution
This species occurs in European waters and in the Mediterranean Sea.

References

 Backeljau, T. (1986). Lijst van de recente mariene mollusken van België [List of the recent marine molluscs of Belgium]. Koninklijk Belgisch Instituut voor Natuurwetenschappen: Brussels, Belgium. 106 pp
 Gofas, S.; Le Renard, J.; Bouchet, P. (2001). Mollusca, in: Costello, M.J. et al. (Ed.) (2001). European register of marine species: a check-list of the marine species in Europe and a bibliography of guides to their identification. Collection Patrimoines Naturels, 50: pp. 180–213
 Gofas S., Garilli V. & Boisselier-Dubayle M.C. (2004). Nomenclature of the smaller Mediterranean Cerithium species. Bollettino Malacologico 39(5-8): 95–104

Cerithiidae
Gastropods described in 1792